The Odessa Bolshevik uprising was a Bolshevik-led uprising of workers and sailors allied with approaching Red Guards forces of Soviet Russia.

In December 1917, the 2nd Congress of Rumcherod elected the Bolshevik Executive Committee and adopted a decision on transferring all power to the Soviets. On January 17, 1918 the conference of city factory committees elected the city's military revolutionary committee (the Committee of 15th) which consisted of the Bolsheviks Vladimir Yudovsky (chair), P.Starostin, G.Achkanov, Makar Chizhikov and others. The next day, a conference of representatives of 49 enterprises, soldiers and sailors took place in Odessa, expressing support for the establishment of the Soviet regime.

The uprising started on January 27, 1918 and involved formations of local Red Guards, Okhtyrka Hussars Regiment, 40th and 49th reserve regiments, and other units. The insurgents were supported by the battleships "Sinop", "Rhostislav" and the cruiser "Almaz" aboard which was the headquarters of the uprising and military tribunal. The Black Sea Fleet ships along with the armored train "Zaamurets" were part of the approaching expeditionary force of Muravyov which joined the uprising later. On the first day Red Guards secured the headquarters of the Odessa Military District, rail station, post office, banks and other institutions. The next day on January 28, 1918, the local haidamakas freed the district's headquarters, rail station and post office from the Bolsheviks, but on January 29, the Red Guards and revolutionary soldiers and sailors were able to defeat forces of the Ukrainian People's Republic which completely surrendered on January 30, after which the Soviet regime was established in the city. But after signing of the Brest-Litovsk Treaty all Bolshevik forces were driven out by 13 March 1918 by the combined armed forces of the Austro-Hungarian Army, providing support to the Ukrainian People's Republic.

See also
 Odessa Soviet Republic

Further reading
 In fight for October (March 1917 - January 1918). Collection of documents and materials about participation of the Odessa workers in fight for establishment of Soviet power. Odessa 1957
 Fighters for October. Odessa 1957
 From history of the Odessa party organization. Odessa 1964
 Victory of the Great October Socialist Revolution in Ukraine. Kyiv 1967

References

External links
Odessa January Armed Uprising 1918. Ukrainian Soviet Encyclopedia.

Russian Revolution in Ukraine
Political history of Ukraine
1918 in Ukraine
Conflicts in 1918
Bolshevik uprisings
Communism in Ukraine
History of Odesa
Military history of Ukraine
January 1918 events